Peter Ralph Forman (9 March 1934 – 3 October 2022) was an English amateur first-class cricketer who played for Nottinghamshire from 1959 to 1962.

Forman attended Oakham School, where he played in the First XI from 1948 to 1951. A slow left-arm spinner, his best first-class figures were 5 for 73 for Nottinghamshire against Glamorgan in 1962. He captained the Nottinghamshire Second XI in 1961.

Forman was a director of the family building company Forman and Linacre. He lived in the Nottinghamshire village of East Leake.

He died on 3 October 2022, aged 88.

References

1934 births
2022 deaths
English cricketers
People educated at Oakham School
Nottinghamshire cricketers
People from West Bridgford
Cricketers from Nottinghamshire